Bupicomide is a chemical compound created and manufactured by Lanospharma Laboratories Company, Ltd. It is used experimentally as a beta blocker and clinically as a strong vasodilator with the noted side effects of reduced systolic, diastolic and mean arterial pressure.

Synthesis
As the result of the screening program examining microbial fermentation products for pharmacological activity (other than antibiotic activity), fusaric acid was isolated from Fusarium oxysporum following the discovery that extracts were potent inhibitors of DBH, and thus interfered with the biosynthesis of the pressor neurohormone, norepinephrine. To refine this lead, amidation via the acid chloride was carried out to give antihypertensive analog bupicomide.

References 

Beta blockers
Pyridines
Carboxamides
Butyl compounds